The 14th Reserve Division (14. Reserve-Division) was a unit of the Imperial German Army in World War I. The division was formed on the mobilization of the German Army in August 1914. The division was disbanded in 1919, during the demobilization of the German Army after World War I. The division was a reserve division of the VII Reserve Corps and was recruited primarily in the Province of Westphalia and the Rhine Province. The division included an active infantry brigade from the 14th Division.

Combat chronicle

The 14th Reserve Division fought on the Western Front, participating in the opening German offensive, which led to the Allied Great Retreat, including the capture of Namur and Maubeuge. Thereafter, the division remained in the line in the Aisne region until October 1915, and then went into Army reserve for two months. It fought in the Battle of Verdun from February to September 1916, and remained in the line at Verdun thereafter. It went to the Somme region at the end of 1916 and to the Champagne region in late January 1917, fighting in the Second Battle of the Aisne, also called the Third Battle of Champagne, from April to May. After a few months near Reims, the division went to the region along the Ailette River. In 1918, it participated in the German spring offensive. It was then primarily on the defensive, resisting various Allied offensives including those of the Hundred Days Offensive. Allied intelligence rated the division as first class.

Order of battle on mobilization

The order of battle of the 14th Reserve Division on mobilization was as follows:

28. Infanterie-Brigade
Niederrheinisches Füsilier-Regiment Nr. 39
8. Lothringisches Infanterie-Regiment Nr. 159
27. Reserve-Infanterie-Brigade
Reserve-Infanterie-Regiment Nr. 16
Reserve-Infanterie-Regiment Nr. 53
Reserve-Husaren-Regiment Nr. 8
Reserve-Feldartillerie-Regiment Nr. 14
1. Reserve-Kompanie/Westfälisches Pionier-Bataillon Nr. 7
2. Reserve-Kompanie/Westfälisches Pionier-Bataillon Nr. 7

Order of battle on January 1, 1918

The 14th Reserve Division was triangularized in March 1915. Over the course of the war, other changes took place, including the formation of artillery and signals commands and a pioneer battalion. The order of battle on January 1, 1918, was as follows:

27. Reserve-Infanterie-Brigade
Reserve-Infanterie-Regiment Nr. 16
Reserve-Infanterie-Regiment Nr. 53
8. Lothringisches Infanterie-Regiment Nr. 159
1.Eskadron/Reserve-Husaren-Regiment Nr. 5
Artillerie-Kommandeur 102
Reserve-Feldartillerie-Regiment Nr. 14
Stab Pionier-Bataillon Nr. 314
1.Reserve-Kompanie/Westfälisches Pionier-Bataillon Nr. 7
2.Reserve-Kompanie/Westfälisches Pionier-Bataillon Nr. 7
Minenwerfer-Kompanie Nr. 214
Divisions-Nachrichten-Kommandeur 414

References
 14. Reserve-Division (Chronik 1914/1918) - Der erste Weltkrieg
 Hermann Cron et al., Ruhmeshalle unserer alten Armee (Berlin, 1935)
 Hermann Cron, Geschichte des deutschen Heeres im Weltkriege 1914-1918 (Berlin, 1937)
 Günter Wegner, Stellenbesetzung der deutschen Heere 1815-1939. (Biblio Verlag, Osnabrück, 1993), Bd. 1
 Histories of Two Hundred and Fifty-One Divisions of the German Army which Participated in the War (1914-1918), compiled from records of Intelligence section of the General Staff, American Expeditionary Forces, at General Headquarters, Chaumont, France 1919 (1920)

Notes

Infantry divisions of Germany in World War I
Military units and formations established in 1914
Military units and formations disestablished in 1919
1914 establishments in Germany